Apalacris varicornis is a species of grasshopper in the family Acrididae. It is found in Indomalaya and has been recorded as a minor agricultural pest in Thailand and Malaysia.

References

External links

 

Catantopinae
Orthoptera of Indo-China
Orthoptera of Malesia